Abdillah is a surname. Notable people with the surname include:

 Datu Patinggi Abang Haji Abdillah (1862–1946), Sarawak patriot
 Haudi Abdillah (born 1993), Indonesian footballer
 Jamal Abdillah (born 1959), Malaysian singer and actor
 Puja Abdillah (born 1996), Indonesian footballer

See also
 Abdullah (name)